Li Lun, Lad of Courage is a children's novel by Carolyn Treffinger. Set on an island off the coast of China, it tells the story of a boy who tries to survive and grow rice on a barren mountain after being banished from his village. The novel, illustrated by Kurt Wiese, was first published in 1947 and was a Newbery Honor recipient in 1948.

References

External links

 

1947 American novels
American children's novels
Newbery Honor-winning works
Novels set in China
1947 children's books
Novels set on islands
Books illustrated by Kurt Wiese